Ranko Jakovljević (born 17 November 1966) is a Bosnian-Swiss retired football goalkeeper and later manager.

References

1966 births
Living people
Sportspeople from Banja Luka
Bosnia and Herzegovina emigrants to Switzerland
Association football goalkeepers
Yugoslav footballers
Bosnia and Herzegovina footballers
FK Borac Banja Luka players
FC Naters players
Yugoslav Second League players
Bosnia and Herzegovina expatriate footballers
Expatriate footballers in Switzerland
Bosnia and Herzegovina expatriate sportspeople in Switzerland
Swiss football managers
FC Aarau managers
Grasshopper Club Zürich non-playing staff
FC Wohlen managers
FC Baden managers